Marco Filippini (born 19 September 1988) is an Italian footballer.

Career
Filippini started his career at Montichiari of Serie C2. He was signed by Internazionale in July 2007.  He made his debut on 17 January 2008, a Coppa Italia match that won Reggina 3–0. In that match, he replaced Nicolás Burdisso in 83rd minute. In 2008, he returned to Montichiari and followed the team relegated to Serie D in 2009. He won promotion back to professional league in 2010. That season he played 20 times in Serie D.

References

External links
 gazzetta.it
http://aic.football.it/scheda/15994/filippini-marco.htm
http://laseried.com/giocatori-cnd/Difensore/marco-filippini-417.php

Italian footballers
Inter Milan players
Association football defenders
Sportspeople from the Province of Brescia
1988 births
Living people
A.C. Montichiari players
Footballers from Lombardy